Montchauvet is a commune in the Yvelines department in the Île-de-France region in north-central France.

River
The Ru d'Ouville is a tributary of the Vaucouleurs which in turn empties into the Seine.

History
A British bomber was shot down in the area of Montchauvet on 8 June 1944. The six men of its crew rest in the local graveyard.

See also
Communes of the Yvelines department

References

External links

Official website 

Communes of Yvelines